The Venus-class frigates were three 36-gun sailing frigates of the fifth rate produced for the Royal Navy. They were designed in 1756 by Sir Thomas Slade, and were enlarged from his design for the 32-gun Southampton-class frigates, which had been approved four months earlier.

The 36-gun frigates, of which this was to be the only British design in the era of the 12-pounder frigate, carried the same battery of twenty-six 12-pounders as the 32-gun predecessors; the only difference lay in the secondary armament on the quarter deck, which was here doubled to eight 6-pounders. Slade's 36-gun design was approved on 13 July 1756, on which date two ships were approved to be built by contract to these plans. A third ship was ordered about two weeks later, to be built in a royal dockyard.

The Venus-class were faster than their Southampton-class predecessors, making up to 13 knots ahead of strong winds and ten knots while close-hauled compared with Southampton-class speeds of 12 and 8 knots respectively. Both Venus- and Southampton-class frigates were highly maneuverable and capable of withstanding heavy weather, in comparison with their French counterparts during the Seven Years' War.

Ships in class

References

Bibliography

 

Frigate classes
Frigates of the United Kingdom
Ship classes of the Royal Navy